Jesus and Mary College (JMC) is a women-only college of the University of Delhi located in New Delhi, India. The college offers bachelor's degrees in Commerce, Arts, and Mathematics. The college offers honors degrees in Elementary Education, History, Sociology, Political Science, Vocational Studies, Hindi, English, Economics, Psychology, Mathematics, and Commerce. The college is located in the Chanakyapuri diplomatic enclave in New Delhi, adjacent to Maitreyi College.

Due to the construction of Pink Line, Jesus and Mary College is quite accessible via Delhi Metro. The nearest metro station is Durgabai Deshmukh South Campus metro station which is around 1 km from the college.

History
The college was founded by Religious of Jesus and Mary, a Roman Catholic congregation founded by St. Claudine Thevenet or known as Mary of St. Ignatius (1774–1837) in Lyon, France, in 1818. The Convent of Jesus and Mary, Delhi was established in 1919, and thereafter a college for women in Delhi and the college was founded in July 1968. At the time of opening, the college offered only two degrees: English (Hons.) and BA (Pass), but quickly expanded to offer degrees in other subjects.

Jesus and Mary College is one of the few colleges in the University of Delhi whose student body is not affiliated with Delhi University Students Union (DUSU).

Academics

Rankings 

It is ranked 37th among colleges in India by National Institutional Ranking Framework in 2020.

Admission 
The admission to the college is based on a competitive cut-off percentage in senior secondary exams. The college also reserves a certain number of seats for Scheduled Caste and Scheduled Tribe (SC/ST) candidates. As a minority institution, the college also has a 50% reservation for Catholic or other Christian students.

Courses
Undergraduate courses:

 Bachelor of Arts (Hons.) in Economics, English, Hindi, History, Political Science, Psychology, Sociology
 B.A. Programme: Discipline Subject Combination
 Bachelor of Commerce (Hons.)
 Bachelor of Commerce
 Bachelor of Science (Hons.) Mathematics
 Bachelor of Elementary Education (4 Years Course)
 Bachelor of Vocational Studies	(B.Voc:-Health care Management & B.Voc:-Retail Management & IT)

(Note: All undergraduate degree courses except B.El.Ed shall be taught in three years, semester mode)

Postgraduate courses:

 Master of Arts—English
 Master of Arts—Hindi

Projects 
Student involvement in projects as part of curriculum is given below:

 Departments like B.El.Ed. (IIIrd year) and Psychology have 100% student involvement in in-house projects over the past four years.
 The Department of Economics has 83% of its students work as interns in institutions and companies like DMRC, Ernst and Young, German National Tourists Services, HUDCO, King's College London, Lucid Solutions, the Planning Commission, Reliance Securities, Smilyo, Toxics Link, United Nations Projects. The department has also worked with NGOs like Kalpavriksha and Samavesh.
 The Department of English has 100% student involvement in in-house projects related to academic topics of English.

Student life

Societies
Sources:

 180 Degree Consulting
 All India Catholic University Federation
 Cauldron, the English Magazine Society
 Curiosus, the English Quiz Society
 Dastaan - the art and architecture society
 E-Cell, The Entrepreneurship Cell
 Echo, the western music society
 Enactus
 English Debating Society 
 Estrategia: The Case Study Cell
 The Equal Opportunity Cell 
 Ethnic Eight, the Northeast society
 Finance and Investment Cell
 Global Youth JMC Chapter
 Green Society
 Iris, the Fine Arts Society
 Jesus and Mary College Education Programme
 JMC-MUN Society
 Kahkasha, Hindi Dramatics society
 Karwaan, the mental health awareness society
 Management Interaction Cell
 Manthan- Hindi debating society
 Mercatus, the Marketing Society
 The Mercurian Times
 Mudra, the Western Dance society
 National Cadet Corp
 National Service Scheme
 National Sports Organisation
 Neev, Training and Development Centre
 Panorama, the film-making and film appreciation society
 Peace Society
 The Photography Society
 Puzzle society
 Sunny Mugs, the Poetry Society
 Tarannum - Indian culture society
 Troubadours, the English theatre society
 Women's Study Centre

Notable alumni

Notable alumni of Jesus and Mary college include:

 B. V. Nagarathna, judge of the Hon'ble Supreme Court of India, in line to become the first female Chief Justice of India in 2027
 Neha Dhupia, Bollywood Actress, model and Miss India Universe 2002
 Hasleen Kaur, Bollywood Actress, model and Miss India Earth 2011
 Nistula Hebbar, journalist and political correspondent
 Ankita Shorey, model and Miss India International 2011
 Priyanka Gandhi Vadra, Politician, Daughter of the former Prime Minister Rajiv Gandhi
 Ampareen Lyngdoh, Politician 
 Namita Gokhale, writer
 Usha Sanyal, historian
 Ambika Anand, TV anchor (NDTV Good Times)
 Sushmita Mukherjee, TV & movie actress
 Rini Simon Khanna, news anchor
 Rakul Preet Singh, Film Actress and Femina Miss India-Miss India People's Choice 2011
 Apurvi Chandela, Indian Shooter
 Sandali Sinha, Film Actress
 Radhika Madan, Actress, Professional Dancer
 Manika Batra, Indian Table Tennis player
 Safoora Zargar, Student activist.
 Simone Singh, Film Actress (popular for TV show "Ek haseena Thi")
 Tanvir Gill (Commerce Department): News Anchor at CNBC
 Sangeeta Kumari Singh Deo (1979–81): Member of the National Executive, BJP, Member of Parliament from Bolangir, Odisha in the 12th Lok Sabha 1998–99, 13th Lok Sabha 1999–04, 14th Lok Sabha 2004–09.
 Prachi Tehlan, former captain of India national netball team
 Ganieve Kaur Majithia, MLA from Majitha, Punjab

References

General bibliography

External links
 Official website
 Jesus and Mary College at wikimapia

1968 establishments in Delhi
Catholic universities and colleges in India
Educational institutions established in 1968
Delhi University
Women's universities and colleges in Delhi